John Gillespie (October 22, 1839January 21, 1871) was a Scottish American immigrant, farmer, and Republican politician.  He served two terms in the Wisconsin State Assembly, representing Sauk County.

Early life
John Gillespie was born in Wigtown, Scotland, in October 1839.  He emigrated to the United States with his parents in 1847, settling for a time in Vermont, before moving to St. Lawrence County, New York. Both of his parents died there in September 1851.  John moved west with his siblings in October 1856, settling at Dellona, in Sauk County, Wisconsin.

Civil War service
At the outbreak of the American Civil War, Gillespie enlisted for service with the Union Army.  He was enrolled in Company E of the 12th Wisconsin Infantry Regiment and was elected first lieutenant of the company.  The regiment mustered into federal service in October 1861, and proceeded to Missouri for service in the western theater of the war.  Within a few months, their captain resigned and Gillespie was promoted to captain as of May 11, 1862.

The regiment was engaged in guard duty in western Kentucky and Tennessee until December 1862, when they joined Ulysses S. Grant's Vicksburg campaign.  They participated in the Battle of Jackson and successfully concluded the Siege of Vicksburg.  In the consolidation of Union control over Mississippi, they participated in William Tecumseh Sherman's Meridian campaign, which laid waste to central Mississippi en route to capture Meridian, Mississippi.

They then set out on the Atlanta campaign under General Sherman.  Gillespie participated in the Battle of Kennesaw Mountain and the Battle of Atlanta.  At Atlanta he was wounded and taken prisoner, where his arm was amputated.  He remained a prisoner until the end of the war and mustered out in June 1865.

Postbellum years
After the war, Gillespie returned to Dellona and engaged in farming.  He was elected to the Wisconsin State Assembly in 1867, running on the Republican Party ticket.  He was re-elected in 1868 but was not a candidate for re-election in 1869.  After his legislative term, he moved to the city of Kilbourn, Wisconsin, in Columbia County.  He died there on January 21, 1871, at age 31.  The Grand Army of the Republic post at Kilbourn was named in his honor in 1882.

Personal life and family
John Gillespie's eldest brother, Thomas Gillespie, also served in the Wisconsin State Assembly.  His younger brother, James A. Gillespie also served as a Union Army officer near the end of the Civil War, and died about the same young age.

John Gillespie married Lorette Huggins.  They had no known children.

References

1839 births
1871 deaths
Scottish emigrants to the United States
People from Wigtown
People from Sauk County, Wisconsin
People from Wisconsin Dells, Wisconsin
People of Wisconsin in the American Civil War
Union Army officers
American Civil War prisoners of war
Republican Party members of the Wisconsin State Assembly